Machesney Park is a village located in Winnebago County, Illinois, United States. The population was 23,499 at the 2010 census, up from 20,759 in 2000. Machesney Park is a suburb of Rockford, Il and is part of the Rockford, Illinois Metropolitan Statistical Area.

Geography

Machesney Park is located at  (42.354989, -89.040827).

Demographics

At the 2010 census there were 23,499 people, 9,351 households. The racial makeup of the village was 91.47% White, 2.83% African American, 0.24% Native American, 1.55% Asian, 0.03% Pacific Islander, 1.63% from other races, and 2.25% from two or more races. Hispanic or Latino of any race were 4.99%.

In 2000 Of the 7,756 households 35.9% had children under the age of 18 living with them, 61.2% were married couples living together, 9.7% had a female householder with no husband present, and 24.2% were non-families. 19.2% of households were one person and 6.6% were one person aged 65 or older. The average household size was 2.68 and the average family size was 3.04.

The age distribution was 24.3% under the age of 18, 5.46% from 20 to 24, 12.41% from 25 to 34, 22.83% from 35 to 49, 19.81% from 50 to 64 and 12.40% 65 or older. The median age was 36 years. There were about as many females as males (9 more males).

In 2000 The median household income was $48,315, and the median family income  was $53,788. Males had a median income of $38,619 versus $23,279 for females. The per capita income for the village was $19,685. About 3.2% of families and 5.3% of the population were below the poverty line, including 6.7% of those under age 18 and 4.8% of those age 65 or over.

History 

The name Machesney Park has its roots in Machesney Airport, which was located on the main street North Second where the Machesney Mall stands today, which was founded in 1927 by Fred Machesney, a Barnstorming aviator. The Machesney Elementary School across the street from where the airport was located was also named after Fred Machesney's airport. The airfield was Rockford's main airport until the 1950s, when the Greater Rockford Airport came on line.  In 1928 a famous flight from Rockford to Sweden took off from the field.  The attempt failed as the two pilots crashed in Greenland, later being safely rescued.  Machesney Field was used by the Army Air Corps during World War II as a stop by fighter aircraft being ferried to the Soviet Union.

This area of unincorporated Winnebago county saw growth pick up after World War II.  This led to the formation of North Park, a public water district and volunteer firefighting company, and the unofficial name for the area.

Machesney Park became a village in 1981, after being approved in a referendum.  Steve Johnson is the current village president.

Education 

The Village is home of Harlem High School, which is part of the Harlem School District 122. The Harlem District serves the communities of Loves Park, Machesney Park, and southern Roscoe.

Village presidents 

 Linda Vaughn (D) 2001 - 2009 
 Tom Strickland (R) 2009 - 2013
 Jerry D. Bolin 2013 - 2017
 Steve Johnson 2017 - current

References

External links
Home Page

Villages in Illinois
Villages in Winnebago County, Illinois
Rockford metropolitan area, Illinois
Populated places established in 1927